The A-1 (also informally known as) is a Spanish autovía route which starts in Madrid and ends in Irun. It replaced the former national road from Madrid to France, the N-I. It carries the designation of European route E05, and, as one of the major north-south arteries of Spain, is one of the country's busiest highways.

Between Burgos and Armiñón there is a toll alternative for this autovía, the autopista AP-1.

In 2011, work was ongoing to bring the section between Burgos and Madrid up to modern standards.

Sections 
Autovía A-1 currently has two sections: one between Madrid and Burgos and another between Miranda de Ebro and Alsasua. Traffic through the 49.6 km discontinuity between Burgos and Miranda de Ebro is redirected to the N-I. Beyond Altsasu, traffic continues on the N-I to the French border.

Major cities crossed

Madrid
Aranda de Duero
Burgos
Vitoria-Gasteiz
Donostia
Irun

References

External links

Autovía A-1 in Google Maps

A-1
A-1
A-1
A-1
A-1